Superior Court of Justice may refer to:

 Superior Court of Justice (Brazil)
 Superior court of justice (Luxembourg)
 Ontario Superior Court of Justice
 Superior Courts of Justice of Peru
 Supreme Court of Justice of the Nation (Mexico)

See also 
 Quebec Superior Court
 Superior court